Chahar Takhteh or Chahartakhteh may refer to:

Chahar Takhteh, Lorestan
Chahar Takhteh Guk, Razavi Khorasan Province